Enterprise, Missouri, may refer to:

 Enterprise, Linn County, Missouri, an unincorporated community
 Enterprise, McDonald County, Missouri, a ghost town
 Enterprise, Shelby County, Missouri, an unincorporated community